The Côte des Blancs  is an area of Champagne vineyards. The Côte des Blancs is a mostly eastern-facing slope that owes its name to the color of the grape that is planted: 95% Chardonnay. Champagnes in this area include the term "blanc de blancs".

Only four villages are located on the actual Côtes des Blancs slope, namely Avize, Cramant, Le Mesnil-sur-Oger and Oger but all municipalities between Cuis and Bergères-les-Vertus have their vineyards on the côtes. The Côte des Blancs yields popular champagnes, which are known for light and delicate aromas, finesse and elegance. The Côtes des Blancs is the source of Chardonnay for many vintage Champagnes and prestige cuvées from the large Champagne houses.

Classification
Côte des Blancs includes six villages classified as grand cru.

Avize
Chouilly
Cramant
Le Mesnil-sur-Oger
Oger
Oiry

References

Wine regions of France
Champagne (wine)